In philosophy, the term idealism identifies and describes metaphysical perspectives which assert that reality is indistinguishable and inseparable from perception and understanding; that reality is a mental construct closely connected to ideas. Idealist perspectives are in two categories: subjective idealism, which proposes that a material object exists only to the extent that a human being perceives the object; and objective idealism, which proposes the existence of an objective consciousness that exists prior to and independently of human consciousness, thus the existence of the object is independent of human perception.

The philosopher George Berkeley said that the essence of an object is to be perceived. By contrast, Immanuel Kant said that idealism "does not concern the existence of things," but that "our modes of representation" of things such as space and time are not "determinations that belong to things in themselves," but are essential features of the human mind. In the philosophy of "transcendental idealism" Kant proposes that the objects of experience relied upon their existence in the human mind that perceives the objects, and that the nature of the thing-in-itself is external to human experience, and cannot be conceived without the application of categories, which give structure to the human experience of reality.

Epistemologically, idealism is accompanied by philosophical skepticism about the possibility of knowing the existence of any thing that is independent of the human mind. Ontologically, idealism asserts that the existence of things depends upon the human mind; thus, ontological idealism rejects the perspectives of physicalism and dualism, because neither perspective gives ontological priority to the human mind. In contrast to materialism, idealism asserts the primacy of consciousness as the origin and prerequisite of phenomena. Idealism holds that consciousness (the mind) is the origin of the material world.

Indian and Greek philosophers proposed the earliest arguments that the world of experience is grounded in the mind's perception of the physical world. Hindu idealism and Greek neoplatonism gave panentheistic arguments for the existence of an all-pervading consciousness as the true nature, as the true grounding of reality. In contrast, the Yogācāra school, which arose within Mahayana Buddhism in India in the 4th century AD, based its "mind-only" idealism to a greater extent on phenomenological analyses of personal experience. This turn toward the subjective anticipated empiricists such as George Berkeley, who revived idealism in 18th-century Europe by employing skeptical arguments against materialism. Beginning with Kant, German idealists such as Georg Wilhelm Friedrich Hegel, Johann Gottlieb Fichte, Friedrich Wilhelm Joseph Schelling, and Arthur Schopenhauer dominated 19th-century philosophy. This tradition, which emphasized the mental or "ideal" character of all phenomena, gave birth to idealistic and subjectivist schools ranging from British idealism to phenomenalism to existentialism.

Idealism as a philosophy came under heavy attack in the West at the turn of the 20th century. The most influential critics of both epistemological and ontological idealism were G. E. Moore and Bertrand Russell, but its critics also included the new realists. According to Stanford Encyclopedia of Philosophy, the attacks by Moore and Russell were so influential that even more than 100 years later "any acknowledgment of idealistic tendencies is viewed in the English-speaking world with reservation." However, many aspects and paradigms of idealism did still have a large influence on subsequent philosophy. Phenomenology, an influential strain of philosophy since the beginning of the 20th century, also draws on the lessons of idealism. In his Being and Time, Martin Heidegger famously states:

Definitions
Idealism is a term with several related meanings. It comes via Latin idea from the Ancient Greek idea (ἰδέα) from idein (ἰδεῖν), meaning "to see." The term entered the English language by 1743. It was first used in the abstract metaphysical sense "belief that reality is made up only of ideas" by Christian Wolff in 1747. The term re-entered the English language in this abstract sense by 1796.

In ordinary language, as when speaking of Woodrow Wilson's political idealism, it generally suggests the priority of ideals, principles, values, and goals over concrete realities. Idealists are understood to represent the world as it might or should be, unlike pragmatists, who focus on the world as it presently is. In the arts, similarly, idealism affirms imagination and attempts to realize a mental conception of beauty, a standard of perfection, juxtaposed to aesthetic naturalism and realism. The term idealism is also sometimes used in a sociological sense, which emphasizes how human ideas—especially beliefs and values—shape society.

Any philosophy that assigns crucial importance to the ideal or spiritual realm in its account of human existence may be termed "idealist." Metaphysical idealism is an ontological doctrine that holds that reality itself is incorporeal or experiential at its core. Beyond this, idealists disagree on which aspects of the mental are more basic. Platonic idealism affirms that abstractions are more basic to reality than the things we perceive, while subjective idealists and phenomenalists tend to privilege sensory experience over abstract reasoning. Epistemological idealism is the view that reality can only be known through ideas, that only psychological experience can be apprehended by the mind.

Subjective idealists like George Berkeley are anti-realists in terms of a mind-independent world. However, not all idealists restrict the real or the knowable to our immediate subjective experience. Objective idealists make claims about a transempirical world, but simply deny that this world is essentially divorced from or ontologically prior to the mental. Thus, Plato and Gottfried Leibniz affirm an objective and knowable reality transcending our subjective awareness—a rejection of epistemological idealism—but propose that this reality is grounded in ideal entities, a form of metaphysical idealism. Nor do all metaphysical idealists agree on the nature of the ideal; for Plato, the fundamental entities were non-mental abstract forms, while for Leibniz they were proto-mental and concrete monads.

As a rule, transcendental idealists like Kant affirm idealism's epistemic side without committing themselves to whether reality is ultimately mental; objective idealists like Plato affirm reality's metaphysical basis in the mental or abstract without restricting their epistemology to ordinary experience; and subjective idealists like Berkeley affirm both metaphysical and epistemological idealism.

Classical idealism

Pre-Socratic philosophy
Idealism as a form of metaphysical monism holds that consciousness, not matter, is the ground of all being. It is monist because it holds that there is only one type of thing in the universe and idealist because it holds that one thing to be consciousness.

Anaxagoras (480 BC) taught that "all things" were created by Nous ("Mind"). He held that Mind held the cosmos together and gave human beings a connection to the cosmos or a pathway to the divine.

Platonism and neoplatonism
Plato's theory of forms or "ideas" describes ideal forms (for example the platonic solids in geometry or abstracts like Goodness and Justice), as universals existing independently of any particular instance. Arne Grøn calls this doctrine "the classic example of a metaphysical idealism as a transcendent idealism," while Simone Klein calls Plato "the earliest representative of metaphysical objective idealism." Nevertheless, Plato holds that matter is real, though transitory and imperfect, and is perceived by our body and its senses and given existence by the eternal ideas that are perceived directly by our rational soul. Plato was therefore a metaphysical and epistemological dualist, an outlook that modern idealism has striven to avoid: Plato's thought cannot therefore be counted as idealist in the modern sense.

With the neoplatonist Plotinus, wrote Nathaniel Alfred Boll "there even appears, probably for the first time in Western philosophy, idealism that had long been current in the East even at that time, for it taught... that the soul has made the world by stepping from eternity into time..." Similarly, in regard to passages from the Enneads, "The only space or place of the world is the soul" and "Time must not be assumed to exist outside the soul." Ludwig Noiré wrote: "For the first time in Western philosophy we find idealism proper in Plotinus". However, Plotinus does not address whether we know external objects, unlike Schopenhauer and other modern philosophers.

Christian philosophy
Christian theologians have held idealist views, often based on neoplatonism, despite the influence of Aristotelian scholasticism from the 12th century onward.  However, there is certainly a sense in which the scholastics retained the idealism that came via Augustine right back to Plato.

Later western theistic idealism such as that of Hermann Lotze offers a theory of the "world ground" in which all things find their unity: it has been widely accepted by Protestant theologians. Several modern religious movements, for example the organizations within the New Thought Movement and the Unity Church, may be said to have a particularly idealist orientation. The theology of Christian Science includes a form of idealism: it teaches that all that truly exists is God and God's ideas; that the world as it appears to the senses is a distortion of the underlying spiritual reality, a distortion that may be corrected (both conceptually and in terms of human experience) through a reorientation (spiritualization) of thought.

Chinese philosophy
Wang Yangming, a Ming Chinese neo-Confucian philosopher, official, educationist, calligraphist and general, held that objects do not exist entirely apart from the mind because the mind shapes them. It is not the world that shapes the mind but the mind that gives reason to the world, so the mind alone is the source of all reason, having an inner light, an innate moral goodness and understanding of what is good.

Idealism in Vedic and Buddhist thought

There are currents of idealism throughout Indian philosophy, ancient and modern. Hindu idealism often takes the form of monism or non-dualism, espousing the view that a unitary consciousness is the essence or meaning of the phenomenal reality and plurality.

Buddhist idealism on the other hand is more epistemic and is not a metaphysical monism, which Buddhists consider eternalistic and hence not the Middle Way between extremes espoused by the Buddha.

The oldest reference to Idealism in Vedic texts is in Purusha Sukta of the Rig Veda. This Sukta espouses panentheism by presenting cosmic being Purusha as both pervading all universe and yet being transcendent to it. Absolute idealism can be seen in Chāndogya Upaniṣad, where things of the objective world like the five elements and the subjective world such as will, hope, memory etc. are seen to be emanations from the Self.

Indian philosophy
Idealist notions have been propounded by the Vedanta schools of thought, which use the Vedas, especially the Upanishads as their key texts. Idealism was opposed by dualists Samkhya, the atomists Vaisheshika, the logicians Nyaya, the  linguists Mimamsa and the materialists Cārvāka. There are various sub schools of Vedanta, like Advaita Vedanta (non-dual), Vishishtadvaita and Bhedabheda Vedanta (difference and non-difference).

The schools of Vedanta all attempt to explain the nature and relationship of Brahman (universal soul or Self) and Atman (individual self), which they see as the central topic of the Vedas. One of the earliest attempts at this was Bādarāyaņa's Brahma Sutras, which is canonical for all Vedanta sub-schools. Advaita Vedanta is a major sub school of Vedanta which holds a non-dual Idealistic metaphysics. According to Advaita thinkers like Adi Shankara (788–820) and his contemporary Maṇḍana Miśra, Brahman, the single unitary consciousness or absolute awareness, appears as the diversity of the world because of maya or illusion, and hence perception of plurality is mithya, error. The world and all beings or souls in it have no separate existence from Brahman, universal consciousness, and the seemingly independent soul (jiva) is identical to Brahman. These doctrines are represented in verses such as brahma satyam jagan mithya; jīvo brahmaiva na aparah (Brahman is alone True, and this world of plurality is an error; the individual self is not different from Brahman). Other forms of Vedanta like the Vishishtadvaita of Ramanuja and the Bhedabheda of Bhāskara are not as radical in their non-dualism, accepting that there is a certain difference between individual souls and Brahman. Dvaita school of Vedanta by Madhvacharya maintains the opposing view that the world is real and eternal. It also argues that real Atman fully depends on the reflection of independent Brahman.

The Tantric tradition of Kashmir Shaivism has also been categorized by scholars as a form of Idealism. The key thinker of this tradition is the Kashmirian Abhinavagupta (975–1025 CE).

Modern Vedic Idealism was defended by the influential Indian philosopher Sarvepalli Radhakrishnan in his 1932 An Idealist View of Life and other works, which espouse Advaita Vedanta. The essence of Hindu Idealism is captured by such modern writers as Sri Nisargadatta Maharaj, Sri Aurobindo, P. R. Sarkar, and Sohail Inayatullah.

Buddhist philosophy

Buddhist views which can be said to be similar to Idealism appear in Mahayana Buddhist texts such as the Samdhinirmocana sutra, Laṅkāvatāra Sūtra, Dashabhumika sutra, etc. These were later expanded upon by Indian Buddhist philosophers of the influential Yogacara school, like Vasubandhu, Asaṅga, Dharmakīrti, and Śāntarakṣita. Yogacara thought was also promoted in China by Chinese philosophers and translators like Xuanzang.

There is a modern scholarly disagreement about whether Yogacara Buddhism can be said to be a form of idealism. As Saam Trivedi notes: "on one side of the debate, writers such as Jay Garfield, Jeffrey Hopkins, Paul Williams, and others maintain the idealism label, while on the other side, Stefan Anacker, Dan Lusthaus, Richard King, Thomas Kochumuttom, Alex Wayman, Janice Dean Willis, and others have argued that Yogacara is not idealist." The central point of issue is what Buddhist philosophers like Vasubandhu who used the term vijñapti-matra ("representation-only" or "cognition-only") and formulated arguments to refute external objects actually meant to say.

Vasubandhu's works include a refutation of external objects or externality itself and argues that the true nature of reality is beyond subject-object distinctions. He views ordinary consciousness experience as deluded in its perceptions of an external world separate from itself and instead argues that all there is Vijñapti (representation or conceptualization). Hence Vasubandhu begins his Vimsatika with the verse: All this is consciousness-only, because of the appearance of non-existent objects, just as someone with an optical disorder may see non-existent nets of hair.

Likewise, the Buddhist philosopher Dharmakirti's view of the apparent existence of external objects is summed up by him in the Pramānaṿārttika ('Commentary on Logic and Epistemology'): Cognition experiences itself, and nothing else whatsoever. Even the particular objects of perception, are by nature just consciousness itself.

While some writers like Jay Garfield hold that Vasubandhu is a metaphysical idealist, others see him as closer to an epistemic idealist like Kant who holds that our knowledge of the world is simply knowledge of our own concepts and perceptions of a transcendental world. Sean Butler upholding that Yogacara is a form of idealism, albeit its own unique type, notes the similarity of Kant's categories and Yogacara's Vāsanās, both of which are simply phenomenal tools with which the mind interprets the noumenal realm. Unlike Kant however who holds that the noumenon or thing-in-itself is unknowable to us, Vasubandhu holds that ultimate reality is knowable, but only through non-conceptual yogic perception of a highly trained meditative mind.

Writers like Dan Lusthaus who hold that Yogacara is not a metaphysical idealism point out, for example, that Yogācāra thinkers did not focus on consciousness to assert it as ontologically real, but simply to analyze how our experiences and thus our suffering is created. As Lusthaus notes: "no Indian Yogācāra text ever claims that the world is created by mind. What they do claim is that we mistake our projected interpretations of the world for the world itself, i.e. we take our own mental constructions to be the world." Lusthaus notes that there are similarities to Western epistemic idealists like Kant and Husserl, enough so that Yogacara can be seen as a form of epistemological idealism. However he also notes key differences like the concepts of karma and nirvana. Saam Trivedi meanwhile notes the similarities between epistemic idealism and Yogacara, but adds that Yogacara Buddhism is in a sense its own theory.

Similarly, Thomas Kochumuttom sees Yogacara as "an explanation of experience, rather than a system of ontology" and Stefan Anacker sees Vasubandhu's philosophy as a form of psychology and as a mainly therapeutic enterprise.

Subjective idealism

Subjective idealism (also known as immaterialism) describes a relationship between experience and the world in which objects are no more than collections or bundles of sense data in the perceiver. Proponents include Berkeley, Bishop of Cloyne, an Anglo-Irish philosopher who advanced a theory he called "immaterialism," later referred to as "subjective idealism," contending that individuals can only know sensations and ideas of objects directly, not abstractions such as "matter," and that ideas also depend upon being perceived for their very existence - esse est percipi; "to be is to be perceived."

Arthur Collier published similar assertions though there seems to have been no influence between the two contemporary writers. The only knowable reality is the represented image of an external object. Matter as a cause of that image, is unthinkable and therefore nothing to us. An external world as absolute matter unrelated to an observer does not exist as far as we are concerned. The universe cannot exist as it appears if there is no perceiving mind. Collier was influenced by An Essay Towards the Theory of the Ideal or Intelligible World by Cambridge Platonist John Norris (1701).

Paul Brunton, a British philosopher, mystic, traveler, and guru, taught a type of idealism called "mentalism," similar to that of Bishop Berkeley, proposing a master world-image, projected or manifested by a world-mind, and an infinite number of individual minds participating. A tree does not cease to exist if nobody sees it because the world-mind is projecting the idea of the tree to all minds.

Epistemological idealism is a subjectivist position in epistemology that holds that what one knows about an object exists only in one's mind. Proponents include Brand Blanshard.

A. A. Luce and John Foster are other subjectivists. Luce, in Sense without Matter (1954), attempts to bring Berkeley up to date by modernizing his vocabulary and putting the issues he faced in modern terms, and treats the Biblical account of matter and the psychology of perception and nature. Foster's The Case for Idealism argues that the physical world is the logical creation of natural, non-logical constraints on human sense-experience. Foster's latest defense of his views (phenomenalistic idealism) is in his book A World for Us: The Case for Phenomenalistic Idealism.

Critics of Subjective idealism include Bertrand Russell's popular 1912 book  The Problems of Philosophy, Australian philosopher David Stove, Alan Musgrave, and John Searle.

Transcendental idealism

Transcendental idealism, founded by Immanuel Kant in the eighteenth century, maintains that the mind shapes the world we perceive into the form of space-and-time.

The 2nd edition (1787) contained a Refutation of Idealism to distinguish his transcendental idealism from Descartes's Sceptical Idealism and Berkeley's anti-realist strain of Subjective Idealism. The section Paralogisms of Pure Reason is an implicit critique of Descartes's idealism. Kant says that it is not possible to infer the "I" as an object (Descartes' cogito ergo sum) purely from "the spontaneity of thought." Kant focused on ideas drawn from British philosophers such as Locke, Berkeley and Hume but distinguished his transcendental or critical idealism from previous varieties;

Kant distinguished between things as they appear to an observer and things in themselves, "that is, things considered without regard to whether and how they may be given to us."  We cannot approach the noumenon, the "thing in Itself" without our own mental world. He added that the mind is not a blank slate, tabula rasa but rather comes equipped with categories for organising our sense impressions.

In the first volume of his Parerga and Paralipomena, Schopenhauer wrote his "Sketch of a History of the Doctrine of the Ideal and the Real." He defined the ideal as being mental pictures that constitute subjective knowledge. The ideal, for him, is what can be attributed to our own minds. The images in our head are what comprise the ideal. Schopenhauer emphasized that we are restricted to our own consciousness. The world that appears is only a representation or mental picture of objects. We directly and immediately know only representations. All objects that are external to the mind are known indirectly through the mediation of our mind. He offered a history of the concept of the "ideal" as "ideational" or "existing in the mind as an image."

Charles Bernard Renouvier was the first Frenchman after Nicolas Malebranche to formulate a complete idealistic system, and had a vast influence on the development of French thought. His system is based on Immanuel Kant's, as his chosen term "néo-criticisme" indicates; but it is a transformation rather than a continuation of Kantianism.

Friedrich Nietzsche argued that Kant commits an agnostic tautology and does not offer a satisfactory answer as to the source of a philosophical right to such-or-other metaphysical claims; he ridicules his pride in tackling "the most difficult thing that could ever be undertaken on behalf of metaphysics." The famous "thing-in-itself" was called a product of philosophical habit, which seeks to introduce a grammatical subject: because wherever there is cognition, there must be a thing that is cognized and allegedly it must be added to ontology as a being (whereas, to Nietzsche, only the world as ever changing appearances can be assumed). Yet he attacks the idealism of Schopenhauer and Descartes with an argument similar to Kant's critique of the latter (see above).

Objective idealism

Objective idealism asserts that the reality of experiencing combines and transcends the realities of the object experienced and of the mind of the observer. Proponents include Thomas Hill Green, Josiah Royce, Benedetto Croce and Charles Sanders Peirce.

Absolute idealism

Schelling (1775–1854) claimed that the Fichte's "I" needs the Not-I, because there is no subject without object, and vice versa. So there is no difference between the subjective and the objective, that is, the ideal and the real. This is Schelling's "absolute identity": the ideas or mental images in the mind are identical to the extended objects which are external to the mind.

Absolute idealism is G. W. F. Hegel's account of how existence is comprehensible as an all-inclusive whole. Hegel called his philosophy "absolute" idealism in contrast to the "subjective idealism" of Berkeley and the "transcendental idealism" of Kant and Fichte, which were not based on a critique of the finite and a dialectical philosophy of history as Hegel's idealism was. The exercise of reason and intellect enables the philosopher to know ultimate historical reality, the phenomenological constitution of self-determination, the dialectical development of self-awareness and personality in the realm of History.

In his Science of Logic (1812–1814) Hegel argues that finite qualities are not fully "real" because they depend on other finite qualities to determine them. Qualitative infinity, on the other hand, would be more self-determining and hence more fully real. Similarly finite natural things are less "real"—because they are less self-determining—than spiritual things like morally responsible people, ethical communities and God. So any doctrine, such as materialism, that asserts that finite qualities or natural objects are fully real is mistaken.

Hegel certainly intends to preserve what he takes to be true of German idealism, in particular Kant's insistence that ethical reason can and does go beyond finite inclinations. For Hegel there must be some identity of thought and being for the "subject" (any human observer) to be able to know any observed "object" (any external entity, possibly even another human) at all. Under Hegel's concept of "subject-object identity," subject and object both have Spirit (Hegel's ersatz, redefined, nonsupernatural "God") as their conceptual (not metaphysical) inner reality—and in that sense are identical. But until Spirit's "self-realization" occurs and Spirit graduates from Spirit to Absolute Spirit status, subject (a human mind) mistakenly thinks every "object" it observes is something "alien," meaning something separate or apart from "subject."  In Hegel's words, "The object is revealed to it [to "subject"] by [as] something alien, and it does not recognize itself." Self-realization occurs when Hegel (part of Spirit's nonsupernatural Mind, which is the collective mind of all humans) arrives on the scene and realizes that every "object" is himself, because both subject and object are essentially Spirit.  When self-realization occurs and Spirit becomes Absolute Spirit, the "finite" (man, human) becomes the "infinite" ("God," divine), replacing the imaginary or "picture-thinking" supernatural God of theism: man becomes God. Tucker puts it this way: "Hegelianism . . . is a religion  of self-worship whose fundamental theme is given in Hegel's image of the man who aspires to be God himself, who demands 'something more, namely infinity.'" The picture Hegel presents is "a picture of a self-glorifying humanity striving compulsively, and at the end successfully, to rise to divinity."

Kierkegaard criticized Hegel's idealist philosophy in several of his works, particularly his claim to a comprehensive system that could explain the whole of reality. Where Hegel argues that an ultimate understanding of the logical structure of the world is an understanding of the logical structure of God's mind, Kierkegaard asserts that for God reality can be a system but it cannot be so for any human individual because both reality and humans are incomplete and all philosophical systems imply completeness. For Hegel, a logical system is possible but an existential system is not: "What is rational is actual; and what is actual is rational." Hegel's absolute idealism blurs the distinction between existence and thought: our mortal nature places limits on our understanding of reality;

A major concern of Hegel's Phenomenology of Spirit (1807) and of the philosophy of Spirit that he lays out in his Encyclopedia of the Philosophical Sciences (1817–1830) is the interrelation between individual humans, which he conceives in terms of "mutual recognition." However, what Climacus means by the aforementioned statement, is that Hegel, in the Philosophy of Right, believed the best solution was to surrender one's individuality to the customs of the State, identifying right and wrong in view of the prevailing bourgeois morality. Individual human will ought, at the State's highest level of development, to properly coincide with the will of the State. Climacus rejects Hegel's suppression of individuality by pointing out it is impossible to create a valid set of rules or system in any society which can adequately describe existence for any one individual. Submitting one's will to the State denies personal freedom, choice, and responsibility.

In addition, Hegel does believe we can know the structure of God's mind, or ultimate reality. Hegel agrees with Kierkegaard that both reality and humans are incomplete, inasmuch as we are in time, and reality develops through time. But the relation between time and eternity is outside time and this is the "logical structure" that Hegel thinks we can know. Kierkegaard disputes this assertion, because it eliminates the clear distinction between ontology and epistemology. Existence and thought are not identical and one cannot possibly think existence. Thought is always a form of abstraction, and thus not only is pure existence impossible to think, but all forms in existence are unthinkable; thought depends on language, which merely abstracts from experience, thus separating us from lived experience and the living essence of all beings. In addition, because we are finite beings, we cannot possibly know or understand anything that is universal or infinite such as God, so we cannot know God exists, since that which transcends time simultaneously transcends human understanding.

Bradley saw reality as a monistic whole apprehended through "feeling", a state in which there is no distinction between the perception and the thing perceived. Like Berkeley, Bradley thought that nothing can be known to exist unless it is known by a mind.

Bradley was the apparent target of G.E. Moore's radical rejection of idealism. Moore claimed that Bradley did not understand the statement that something is real. We know for certain, through common sense and prephilosophical beliefs, that some things are real, whether they are objects of thought or not, according to Moore. The 1903 article The Refutation of Idealism is one of the first demonstrations of Moore's commitment to analysis. He examines each of the three terms in the Berkeleian aphorism esse est percipi, "to be is to be perceived", finding that it must mean that the object and the subject are necessarily connected so that "yellow" and "the sensation of yellow" are identical -- "to be yellow" is "to be experienced as yellow." But it also seems there is a difference between "yellow" and "the sensation of yellow" and "that esse is held to be percipi, solely because what is experienced is held to be identical with the experience of it". Though far from a complete refutation, this was the first strong statement by analytic philosophy against its idealist predecessors, or at any rate against the type of idealism represented by Berkeley.

Actual idealism
Actual idealism is a form of idealism developed by Giovanni Gentile that grew into a "grounded" idealism contrasting Kant and Hegel. The idea is a version of Occam's razor; the simpler explanations are always correct. Actual idealism is the idea that reality is the ongoing act of thinking, or in Italian "pensiero pensante". Any action done by humans is classified as human thought because the action was done due to predisposed thought. He further believes that thoughts are the only concept that truly exist since reality is defined through the act of thinking. This idea was derived from Gentile's paper, "The Theory of Mind As Pure Act."

Since thoughts are actions, any conjectured idea can be enacted. This idea not only affects the individual's life, but everyone around them, which in turn affects the state since the people are the state. Therefore, thoughts of each person are subsumed within the state. The state is a composition of many minds that come together to change the country for better or worse.

Gentile theorizes that thoughts can only be conjectured within the bounds of known reality; abstract thinking does not exist. Thoughts cannot be formed outside our known reality because we are the reality that halt ourselves from thinking externally. With accordance to "The Act of Thought of Pure Thought," our actions comprise our thoughts, our thoughts create perception, perceptions define reality, thus we think within our created reality.

The present act of thought is reality but the past is not reality; it is history. The reason being, past can be rewritten through present knowledge and perspective of the event. The reality that is currently constructed can be completely changed through language (e.g. bias (omission, source, tone)). The unreliability of the recorded reality can skew the original concept and make the past remark unreliable. 
Actual idealism is regarded as a liberal and tolerant doctrine since it acknowledges that every being picturizes reality, in which their ideas remained hatched, differently. Even though, reality is a figment of thought.

Even though core concept of the theory is famous for its simplification, its application is regarded as extremely ambiguous. Over the years, philosophers have interpreted it numerously different ways: Holmes took it as metaphysics of the thinking act; Betti as a form of hermeneutics; Harris as a metaphysics of democracy; Fogu as a modernist philosophy of history.

Giovanni Gentile was a key supporter of fascism, regarded by many as the "philosopher of fascism." Gentile's philosophy was the key to understating fascism as it was believed by many who supported and loved it. They believed, if priori synthesis of subject and object is true, there is no difference between the individuals in society; they're all one. Which means that they have equal right, roles, and jobs. In fascist state, submission is given to one leader because individuals act as one body. In Gentile's view, far more can be accomplished when individuals are under a corporate body than a collection of autonomous individuals.

Pluralistic idealism
Pluralistic idealism such as that of Gottfried Leibniz takes the view that there are many individual minds that together underlie the existence of the observed world and make possible the existence of the physical universe. Unlike absolute idealism, pluralistic idealism does not assume the existence of a single ultimate mental reality or "Absolute". Leibniz' form of idealism, known as Panpsychism, views "monads" as the true atoms of the universe and as entities having perception. The monads are "substantial forms of being, "elemental, individual, subject to their own laws, non-interacting, each reflecting the entire universe. Monads are centers of force, which is substance while space, matter and motion are phenomenal and their form and existence is dependent on the simple and immaterial monads. There is a pre-established harmony by God, the central monad, between the world in the minds of the monads and the external world of objects. Leibniz's cosmology embraced traditional Christian theism. The English psychologist and philosopher James Ward inspired by Leibniz had also defended a form of pluralistic idealism. According to Ward the universe is composed of "psychic monads" of different levels, interacting for mutual self-betterment.

Personalism is the view that the minds that underlie reality are the minds of persons. Borden Parker Bowne, a philosopher at Boston University, a founder and popularizer of personal idealism, presented it as a substantive reality of persons, the only reality, as known directly in self-consciousness. Reality is a society of interacting persons dependent on the Supreme Person of God. Other proponents include George Holmes Howison  and J. M. E. McTaggart.

Howison's personal idealism  was also called "California Personalism" by others to distinguish it from the "Boston Personalism" which was of Bowne. Howison maintained that both impersonal, monistic idealism and materialism run contrary to the experience of moral freedom. To deny freedom to pursue truth, beauty, and "benignant love" is to undermine every profound human venture, including science, morality, and philosophy. Personalistic idealists Borden Parker Bowne and Edgar S. Brightman and realistic (in some senses of the term, though he remained influenced by neoplatonism) personal theist Saint Thomas Aquinas address a core issue, namely that of dependence upon an infinite personal God.

Howison, in his book The Limits of Evolution and Other Essays Illustrating the Metaphysical Theory of Personal Idealism, created a democratic notion of personal idealism that extended all the way to God, who was no more the ultimate monarch but the ultimate democrat in eternal relation to other eternal persons. J. M. E. McTaggart's idealist atheism and Thomas Davidson's apeirotheism resemble Howisons personal idealism.

J. M. E. McTaggart argued that minds alone exist and only relate to each other through love. Space, time and material objects are unreal. In The Unreality of Time he argued that time is an illusion because it is impossible to produce a coherent account of a sequence of events. The Nature of Existence (1927) contained his arguments that space, time, and matter cannot possibly be real. In his Studies in Hegelian Cosmology (Cambridge, 1901, p196) he declared that metaphysics are not relevant to social and political action. McTaggart "thought that Hegel was wrong in supposing that metaphysics could show that the state is more than a means to the good of the individuals who compose it". For McTaggart "philosophy can give us very little, if any, guidance in action... Why should a Hegelian citizen be surprised that his belief as to the organic nature of the Absolute does not help him in deciding how to vote? Would a Hegelian engineer be reasonable in expecting that his belief that all matter is spirit should help him in planning a bridge?"

Thomas Davidson taught a philosophy called "apeirotheism", a "form of pluralistic idealism...coupled with a stern ethical rigorism" which he defined as "a theory of Gods infinite in number." The theory was indebted to Aristotle's pluralism and his concepts of Soul, the rational, living aspect of a living substance which cannot exist apart from the body because it is not a substance but an essence, and nous, rational thought, reflection and understanding. Although a perennial source of controversy, Aristotle arguably views the latter as both eternal and immaterial in nature, as exemplified in his theology of unmoved movers. Identifying Aristotle's God with rational thought, Davidson argued, contrary to Aristotle, that just as the soul cannot exist apart from the body, God cannot exist apart from the world.

Idealist notions took a strong hold among physicists of the early 20th century confronted with the paradoxes of quantum physics and the theory of relativity. In The Grammar of Science, Preface to the 2nd Edition, 1900, Karl Pearson wrote, "There are many signs that a sound idealism is surely replacing, as a basis for natural philosophy, the crude materialism of the older physicists." This book influenced Einstein's regard for the importance of the observer in scientific measurements. In § 5 of that book, Pearson asserted that "...science is in reality a classification and analysis of the contents of the mind..." Also, "...the field of science is much more consciousness than an external world."

Arthur Eddington, a British astrophysicist of the early 20th century, wrote in his book The Nature of the Physical World that "The stuff of the world is mind-stuff": 

Ian Barbour in his book Issues in Science and Religion (1966), p. 133, cites Arthur Eddington's The Nature of the Physical World (1928) for a text that argues The Heisenberg Uncertainty Principles provides a scientific basis for "the defense of the idea of human freedom" and his Science and the Unseen World (1929) for support of philosophical idealism "the thesis that reality is basically mental."

Sir James Jeans wrote: "The stream of knowledge is heading towards a non-mechanical reality; the Universe begins to look more like a great thought than like a great machine. Mind no longer appears to be an accidental intruder into the realm of matter... we ought rather hail it as the creator and governor of the realm of matter."

Jeans, in an interview published in The Observer (London), when asked the question: "Do you believe that life on this planet is the result of some sort of accident, or do you believe that it is a part of some great scheme?" replied:

Addressing the British Association in 1934, Jeans said:

In The Universe Around Us, Jeans writes:

The chemist Ernest Lester Smith wrote a book Intelligence Came First (1975) in which he claimed that consciousness is a fact of nature and that the cosmos is grounded in and pervaded by mind and intelligence.

Bernard d'Espagnat, a French theoretical physicist best known for his work on the nature of reality, wrote a paper titled The Quantum Theory and Reality. According to the paper:

In a Guardian article entitled "Quantum Weirdness: What We Call 'Reality' is Just a State of Mind", d'Espagnat wrote:

He further writes that his research in quantum physics has led him to conclude that an "ultimate reality" exists, which is not embedded in space or time.

Contemporary idealists 
There are various philosophers working in contemporary Western philosophy of mind who have recently defended an idealist stance. These include:

 Nicholas Rescher
 Howard Robinson
 Alexander Schnell
 John McDowell  —  Mind and World (1996)
 Vittorio Hösle — Objective Idealism, Ethics and Politics (1998)
 John Leslie — Infinite Minds: A Philosophical Cosmology (2002). 
 John Foster — A World for Us (2008), coming from a traditional Christian theological perspective.
 Timothy Sprigge — The Vindication of Absolute Idealism (1984). 
David Pearce — Non-Materialist Physicalism: An experimentally testable conjecture (2014) 
 Bernardo Kastrup — The Idea of the World (2018)
 Donald D. Hoffman — The Case Against Reality (2019) 
 Iain McGilchrist — The Matter with Things (2021)

See also

 Cogito ergo sum
 Dialectical idealism
 Metaphysical solipsism
 Mind over matter
 Moral idealism
 Neo-Vedanta
 New Thought
 Panpsychism
 Rationality
 Reason
 Spirituality
 Teleological idealism

Notes

References
 Immanuel Kant's Critique of Pure Reason with an historical introduction by Ludwig Noiré, available at 
 Kierkegaard, Søren. Concluding Unscientific Postscript, Princeton, 
 Neujahr, Philip J., Kant's Idealism, Mercer University Press, 1995 
 Watts, Michael. Kierkegaard, Oneworld, 
 Nisargadatta Maharaj (1973), I Am That (Chetana Publishing, Mumbai, India),  (paperback).
 Prabhat Rainjan Sarkar (1984), Human Society . Vols. I and II. (Ananda Marga Publications, Calcutta, India).
 Sri Aurobindo (1984), The Life Divine, (Lotus Press, Twin Lakes, Wisconsin, USA) .
 Surendranath Dasgupta (1969), Indian Idealism (Cambridge University Press, New York, NY, USA), 
 Fritjof Capra (2002), The Tao of Physics: An Exploration of the Parallels Between Modern Physics and Eastern Mysticism (Shambhala Publications of Berkeley, California, USA), .
 Sohail Inayatullah (2001), Understanding P. R. Sarkar: The Indian Episteme, Macrohistory and Transformative Knowledge, (Leiden, Brill Publishers) .

Further reading
 Gustavus Watts Cunningham, Idealistic Argument in Recent British and American Philosophy, Books For Libraries Press, 1967.
 Hugh Joseph Tallon, The concept of self in British and American idealism, Catholic University of America Press, 1939.
 Gerald Thomas Baskfield, The idea of God in British and American personal idealism, Catholic University of America, 1933.
 Vergilius Ture Anselm Ferm, A history of philosophical systems Littlefield Adams, 1968.

External links

 
 
 
 
 
 A. C. Grayling-Wittgenstein on Scepticism and Certainty
 Idealism and its practical use in physics and psychology 
 'The Triumph of Idealism', lecture by Professor Keith Ward offering a positive view of Idealism, at Gresham College, 13 March 2008 (available in text, audio and video download)
 A new theory of ideomaterialism being a synthesis of idealism and materialism

 
Metaphysical theories